Wilkins Highway is an east–west route across the Yorke and Mid North region of South Australia. It runs from Augusta Highway south of Port Pirie east to Barrier Highway at the town of Hallett, near where Sir Hubert Wilkins was born.

Major intersections

References

Highways in South Australia
Mid North (South Australia)